John Snowden (18 January 1923 – 31 December 2000) was a Singaporean sailor. He competed in the Finn event at the 1956 Summer Olympics.

References

External links
 

1923 births
2000 deaths
Singaporean male sailors (sport)
Olympic sailors of Singapore
Sailors at the 1956 Summer Olympics – Finn
Place of birth missing
20th-century Singaporean people